Dainis Dukurs (born 24 January 1954) is a Latvian retired bobsledder, manager of Sigulda bobsleigh, luge, and skeleton track, member of Sigulda municipal council and skeleton coach.

He was born in Alūksne. Dukurs was 1985 Latvian champion in bobsleigh with Jānis Skrastiņš. In 1984 he started to make bobsleigh equipment. Dukurs is coach for his sons Martins and Tomass.

References 

1954 births
Living people
Latvian sports coaches
Latvian male bobsledders
People from Alūksne